Magamuni is a 2019 Indian Tamil-language crime drama film written and directed by Santhakumar. The film stars Arya in dual roles along with Indhuja Ravichandran and Mahima Nambiar. Kaali Venkat, Rohini, Jayaprakash, Ilavarasu, and Aruldoss play supporting roles. S. Thaman scores music for the film, and editing is handled by V. J. Sabu Joseph. Principal photography of the film commenced during November 2018. It was theatrically released by Tarun Pictures on 6 September 2019 to highly positive reviews from both critics and audience.
Magamuni has won several international awards from various film festivals across the world.

Plot 
The film travels back and forth between two characters. Magadevan is a cab driver in Chennai and also works as a thug for a corrupt politician named Muthurajan. Muniraj is a good Samaritan and organic farmer who believes in Swami Vivekananda's teachings, thinks the world of Tamil literature, and lives in a village near Erode. It is made clear that Maga is an atheist while Muni practices yoga and spreads the word of Hinduism.

Maga thinks the world of his wife Viji and five-year-old son. He is also trying to turn a new leaf and leave the world of crime. Muni, on the other hand, is happy living with his loving mother. He wants to be a "Nitya Brahmachari" (bachelor), and at the same time, impart knowledge to students. Deepa is a journalism student and the daughter of a local landlord named Jayaraman, who is in awe of the soft-spoken Muni. Trouble erupts for Maga when one of Muthuraj's rivals, Guru Narayanan, tries to fix him in an earlier murder case, which was planned by him for Muthuraj. Muthuraj, in order to save himself and his nephew, enters into connivance with the police and makes Maga the bad guy. At the same time, Jayaraman does not like his daughter moving around with Muni, a lower-caste man, and wants to eliminate him.

Jayaraman plans to kill Muni via snakebite in his farm; however, Muni is saved and admitted on the hospital by Deepa. Meanwhile, Maga is framed for the murder of Guru Narayanan's brother Surya Narayanan and is wanted by the police. Maga plans to escape to Vizag with his family and lead a normal life. He requests Muthuraj to pay him his balance money so that he can start a new life. However, he does not know that Muthuraj has betrayed him by disclosing his whereabouts to the police and Guru Narayanan. While Maga is on the way to meet Muthuraj, he is chased and shot by the police. Maga, despite being severely wounded, escapes the place by boarding a goods train.

Policemen track Maga's location using his mobile phone signal and find that he is somewhere near Erode. Maga contacts Muthuraj again requesting for help. Muthuraj asks Maga to meet Jayaraman (who also is Muthuraj's friend) in Erode so that he could get some money. In the meantime, policemen search all the hospitals around Erode, suspecting Maga to be treated for his injury. Finally, the police finds Muni in a hospital (as he was admitted for his snakebite) and arrests him, mistaking him for Maga. Meanwhile, Maga goes to Jayaraman's house seeking help. There, a drunk Jayaraman gets shocked upon seeing Maga and mistakes him for Muni, who has come for revenge. Jayaraman tries to attack Maga, but Maga kills Jayaraman to safeguard himself.

Maga's friends find out the true identity of Muthuraj and inform Maga. Maga feels bad for being betrayed by Muthuraj. On the other hand, Muni is handed over to Guru Narayanan by a corrupt police inspector (G. M. Sundar). Guru Narayanan's henchmen attack Muni as a means of revenge, believing him to be Maga. Muni is critically injured and is admitted in the hospital. The police also arrests Viji and her son. Viji thinks that Maga is dead and commits suicide by jumping into a well. Maga learns about Muni from his friends, and he rushes to see him in the hospital. Maga understands that Muni is his twin brother. A small flashback is shown where Maga and Muni's mother was mentally ill, and she left the two children alone on an empty train platform and went away. Maga and Muni are separated when they were kids. Maga was grown in an orphanage, while Muni was adopted by a widow.

Maga gets furious knowing about Viji's death and decides to kill the baddies. He goes to Muthuraj's place and kills everyone including Muthuraj, the police inspector, and Guru Narayanan. As Maga was also shot by police before, he also gets admitted in the same hospital where Muni is present. Unfortunately, Muni passes away. After a few months, it is shown that Maga comes to Muni's village as he feels guilty of Muni's death and decides to follow Muni's path of literature and peace of mind. Maga's son is rescued and is raised by Muni's adoptive mother. When Maga is asked what his name is, he says, "Magamuni."

Cast 

 Arya as Magadevan and Muniraj
 Indhuja Ravichandran as Viji
 Mahima Nambiar as Deepa
 Kaali Venkat as Dr. Raghu
 Rohini as Muni's mother
 Jashik as Prabha Arya'son
 Jayaprakash as Jayaraman
 Ilavarasu as Muthurajan
 Aruldoss as Guru Narayanan
 Madhan Kumar as Aadhi Narayanan
 Bala Singh as Politician
 G. M. Sundar as Corrupt Police Officer
 Krishnamurthy as Surya Narayanan
 Deepa Shankar as Gomathy, Muthuraj's wife
 Yogi as Gopal, Muthuraj's assistant
 Supergood Subramani as Therumunai Thirumurthy
 Sembaruthi Sanjay as Deepa's brother
 Nakkalites Chella
 Thangamani Prabhu

Production 
The film was announced by Santhakumar, who is known for his critically acclaimed Mouna Guru, which was released in 2011. The filming commenced on 14 November 2018, marking the director's second film in his career. The shooting held at a brisk pace and predominantly shot in Chennai, Kancheepuram and Erode. Filmmakers roped in actor Arya to play the male lead who was signed to portray dual roles, one an assassin and another a farmer and vallalar follower.

Release

Theatrical
It was theatrically released by Tarun Pictures on 6 September 2019. It's Dubbed in Hindi as Mahamuni in 2021 February under Goldmines Telefilms.

Home media
The Satellite Rights of the Film was acquired by Colors Tamil. The film is available on Amazon Prime Video and Netflix for digital streaming.

Box office
In the opening weekend, Magamuni collected  at the Chennai box office.

Soundtrack
The soundtrack of the film is composed by S. S. Thaman, continuing his collaboration with the director after Mouna Guru. The lyrics written by Kavignar Muthulingam and Krishnamoorthy Dhanushkodi.

References

External links
 

2010s Tamil-language films
Indian thriller drama films
Indian crime thriller films
Indian crime drama films
2019 thriller drama films
2019 crime thriller films
2019 crime drama films
2019 films